Vitello (– 1280/1314) was a friar, theologian, natural philosopher and an important figure in the history of philosophy in Poland.

Name
Vitello's name varies with some sources. In earlier publications he was quoted as Erazmus Ciolek Witelo, Erazm Ciołek, Vitellio and Vitulon. Today, he is usually referred to by his Latin name Vitello Thuringopolonis, often shortened to Vitello.

Life 
Vitello's exact birth-name and birthplace are uncertain. He was most likely born around 1230 in Silesia, in the vicinity of Legnica. His mother came from a Polish knightly house, while his father was a German settler from Thuringia. He called himself, in Latin, "Thuringorum et Polonorum filius" — "a son of Thuringians and Poles."  He studied at Padua University about 1260, then went on to Viterbo.  He became friends with William of Moerbeke, the translator of Aristotle from Greek language into Latin. Vitello's major surviving work on optics, Perspectiva, completed in about 1270–78, was dedicated to William. In 1284 he described the reflection and refraction of light.

Perspectiva 

Vitello's Perspectiva was largely based on the work of the polymath Alhazen (Ibn al-Haytham; d. ca. 1041) and in turn influenced later scientists, in particular Johannes Kepler. Vitello's treatise in optics was closely linked to the Latin version of Ibn al-Haytham's Arabic opus: Kitab al-manazir (The Book of Optics; De aspectibus or Perspectivae), and both were printed in the Friedrich Risner edition Opticae Thesaurus (Basel, 1572).

Vitello's Perspectiva, which rested on Ibn al-Haytham's research in optics, influenced also the Renaissance theories of perspective. Lorenzo Ghiberti's Commentario terzo (Third Commentary) was based on an Italian translation of Vitello's Latin tract: Perspectiva.

Vitello's treatise also contains much material in psychology, outlining views that are close to modern notions on the association of ideas and on the subconscious.

Perspectiva also includes Platonic metaphysical discussions. Vitello argues that there are intellectual and corporeal bodies, connected by causality (corresponding to the Idealist doctrine of the universal and the actual), emanating from God in the form of Divine Light. Light itself is, for Vitello, the first of all sensible entities, and his views on light are similar to those held by Roger Bacon, though he is closer in this to Alhazen's legacy.

Other works 
In Perspectiva, Vitello refers to other works that he had written. Most of these do not survive, but De Natura Daemonum and De Primaria Causa Paenitentiae have been recovered.

Legacy 
The lunar crater Vitello is named after him.

See also
History of philosophy in Poland
List of Poles
List of Catholic clergy scientists

Notes

References 
Vitello and his thoughts
 Witelonis Perspectivae Liber Primus: Book I of Vitello's Perspectiva, edition and English translation by Sabetai Unguru, with introduction and commentary, Warsaw, The Polish Academy of Science Press, Studia Copernicana, vol. XV, 1977.
 Witelonis Perspectivae Libri Duo - Liber Secundus et Liber Tertius: Books II and III of Vitello's Perspectiva, edition and English translation by Sabetai Unguru, with introduction and commentary, Warsaw, The Polish Academy of Science Press, Studia Copernicana, vol. XXVII, 1991.
 Witelonis Perspectivae Liber Quartus: Book IV of Vitello's Perspectiva, A Critical Edition and English Translation with Introduction, Notes and Commentary by Carl J. Kelso, University of Missouri-Columbia, 2003.
 Witelonis Perspectivae Liber Quintus: Books V of Vitello's Perspectiva, edition and English translation by Mark A. Smith of the First Catoptrical Book of Witelo's Perspectiva, with introduction and commentary, Warsaw, The Polish Academy of Science Press, 1983.

Studies
 Clemens Baeumker, "Witelo: Ein Philosoph und Naturforscher des dreizehnten Jahrhunderts," Beiträge zur Geschichte der Philosophie des Mittelalters, part 3, no. 2,  Münster, Aschendorff, 1908.
 Władysław Tatarkiewicz, Historia filozofii (History of Philosophy), 3 vols., Warsaw, Państwowe Wydawnictwo Naukowe, 1978.
Jerzy Burchardt, "The Discovery of the Rainbow in Crystal by Witelo"

External links
Online Galleries, History of Science Collections, University of Oklahoma Libraries High resolution images of works by and/or portraits of Witelo in .jpg and .tiff format.
 Erasmus Ciołek Witelo monument in the Żórawina village, Wrocław County, Lower Silesian Voivodeship, SW Poland. 

People from Silesia
Historians of philosophy
Natural philosophers
13th-century philosophers
13th-century mathematicians
Catholic clergy scientists
13th-century Polish people
Polish Roman Catholic theologians
Medieval Polish scientists
Polish philosophers
Medieval Polish mathematicians
13th-century German scientists
German philosophers
German physicists
Canons of Wrocław
13th-century German writers
Medieval German mathematicians
13th-century Latin writers
People from Legnica
Scholastic philosophers
Year of birth uncertain
1280 deaths